The Directorate of Military Intelligence (DMI) was a department of the British War Office.

Over its lifetime the Directorate underwent a number of organisational changes, absorbing and shedding sections over time.

History 

The first instance of an organisation which would later become the DMI was the Department of Topography & Statistics, formed by Major Thomas Best Jervis, late of the Bombay Engineer Corps, in 1854 in the early stages of the Crimean War.

In 1873 the Intelligence Branch was created within the Quartermaster General's Department with an initial staff of seven officers. Initially the Intelligence Branch was solely concerned with collecting intelligence, but under the leadership of Henry Brackenbury, a protege of influential Adjutant-General Lord Wolseley, it was increasingly concerned with planning. However despite these steps towards a nascent general staff, the Intelligence Branch remained a purely advisory body, something that sharply limited its influence. The Branch was transferred to the Adjutant General's Department in 1888 and Brackenbury's title was changed to Director of Military Intelligence.

After Wolseley's appointment as Commander-in-Chief of the Forces in 1895, he made the Director of Military Intelligence directly responsible to him. At the outbreak of the Second Boer War in 1899 the Intelligence Branch had 13 officers. Prior to the war it produced a highly accurate summary of the Boer republics' military potential and was the only part of the War Office to escape criticism in the resulting Royal Commission. In the immediate aftermath of the Boer War the Intelligence Branch was enlarged and its head elevated to Director General of Mobilisation and Military Intelligence. 

Following the Esher Report in 1904 the War Office was dramatically reorganized. The post of Commander-in-Chief was abolished and replaced by the Chief of the General Staff. Planning and intelligence would be the responsibility of the Directorate of Military Operations.

When the War Office was subsumed into the Ministry of Defence (MoD) in 1964, the DMI was absorbed into the Defence Intelligence Staff.

Sections 
During World War I, British secret services were divided into numbered sections named Military Intelligence, department number x, abbreviated to MIx, such as MI1 for information management.
The branch, department, section, and sub-section numbers varied through the life of the department; however, examples include:

Two MI section-names remain in common use, MI5 and MI6, in most part due to their use in spy fiction and the news media.

"MI5" is used as the short form name of the Security Service, and is included in the agency's logo and web address. MI6 is included as an alias on the Secret Intelligence Service website, though the official abbreviation, SIS, is predominant.

While the names remain, the agencies are now responsible to different departments of state, MI5 to the Home Office, and MI6 the Foreign Office.

Directors of Military Intelligence
Directors of Military Intelligence have been:

Deputy Quartermaster General, Intelligence Branch
 1873–1878 Patrick Leonard MacDougall
 1878–1882 Archibald Alison
 1882–1886 Aylmer Cameron (Assistant Quartermaster General, Intelligence Branch)
 1886–1888 Henry Brackenbury 
Director of Military Intelligence
 1888–1891 Henry Brackenbury 
 1891–1896 Edward Francis Chapman
 1896–1901 John Charles Ardagh
 Director General of Mobilisation and Military Intelligence
 1901–1904 William Nicholson
Director of Military Operations
 1904–1906 James Grierson
 1906–1910 Spencer Ewart
 1910–1914 Henry Wilson
 1914–1915 Charles Callwell
Director of Military Intelligence
 1915–1916 Charles Callwell
 1916–1918 George Mark Watson Macdonogh
 1918–1922 William Thwaites
Director of Military Operations and Intelligence
 1922–1923 William Thwaites
 1923–1926 John Burnett-Stuart
 1926–1931 Ronald Charles
 1931–1934 William Henry Bartholomew
 1934–1936 John Greer Dill
 1936–1938 Robert Hadden Haining
 1938–1939 Henry Royds Pownall
Director of Military Intelligence
 1939–1940 Frederick Beaumont-Nesbitt
 1940–1944 Francis Henry Norman Davidson
 1944–1945 John Sinclair
 1945–1946 Freddie de Guingand
 1946–1948 Gerald Templer
 1948–1949 Douglas Packard
 1949–1953 Arthur Shortt
 1953–1956 Valentine Boucher
 1956–1959 Cedric Rhys Price
 1959–1962 Richard Eyre Lloyd
 1962–1965 Marshall St John Oswald

References

Sources

Further reading
 The DMI in World War I: Link

Military intelligence agencies
Defunct United Kingdom intelligence agencies
Military communications of the United Kingdom
War Office
War Office in World War II
British intelligence services of World War II